Mayak (meaning The Lighthouse) is a 2006 Russian film directed by Mariya Saakyan. Young director by Maria Sahakyan made picture about the war in the Caucasus, but without the war.

Synopsis
The film is about the war in Armenia from women's point of view. The girl (Lena) from Moscow, rides in a small North-Armenian town, where she was born. Then the war begins. Lena wants to take her grandmother and grandfather out of the town, but having arrived home, she realizes that she has no opportunity to return to Moscow. Lena learns to live in the conditions of war. She realizes that to run away does not mean to escape. The latest frames of the film give us hope that life continues and everything will be fine.

Cast
Anna Kapaleva - Lena
Olga Yakovleva - Grandmother
Sos Sargsyan - Grandfather
Sofiko Chiaureli - neighbour
Ruzana Avetisyan - Roza
Mikhail Bogdasarov - Levan
Anastasiya Grebennikova - Izolda

Awards
London Film Festival
Rotterdam International Film Festival

External links

 

2006 films
2006 drama films
2000s Russian-language films
Russian drama films